36th parallel may refer to:

36th parallel north, a circle of latitude in the Northern Hemisphere
36th parallel south, a circle of latitude in the Southern Hemisphere